Indian Hill is an unincorporated community in New Trier Township, Cook County, Illinois south of Winnetka. The center of the community is located near Indian Hill station on Green Bay Road. It is home to a small "downtown" section, near the train station by the intersection of Winnetka Avenue. It takes its name from a nearby golf club, and has a population of about 6,000.

References

Unincorporated communities in Illinois
Unincorporated communities in Cook County, Illinois
Chicago metropolitan area